Scott Louser (born July 24, 1971) is an American politician who has served in the North Dakota House of Representatives from the 5th district since 2010.

References

1971 births
Living people
People from Minot, North Dakota
Republican Party members of the North Dakota House of Representatives
21st-century American politicians